Stane Street may refer to one of two Roman roads:

 Stane Street (Chichester) – from London Bridge to Chichester (West Sussex)

 Stane Street (Colchester) – from Braughing (Hertfordshire) to Colchester (Essex)
 Stane Street Halt railway station, near Takeley, Essex, adjacent to the above

See also
 Stanegate, a Roman road running from Corbridge to Carlisle to the south of Hadrian's Wall
 Stone Street (disambiguation)